The three-week-long Nanda Devi Raj Jat (नंदा देवी राज जात) is a pilgrimage and festival of Uttarakhand. India. The Raj-Jaat is celebrated in Chamoli Garhwal district, and traditionally only the deities of Garhwal Division took part in it. Sometimes, during the peaceful periods between the Kingdoms of Garhwal and Kumaun, the Goddess "Nanda of Almora" was invited and took part in the Raj-Jaat, while mostly there were separate Nanda-Sunanda fairs in Kumaun. Off late, after the formation of Uttarakhand, the state Government has been trying bring the people from Garhwal and Kumaun together for celebrations and fairs. Hence, in the Nanda Devi Raj Jaat held in the year 2000, the goddess "Almora ki Nanda" took part after 90 years and a number of other deities from Kumaun accompanied her. To facilitate this change, even the traditional route of the Yatra was tweaked and an additional stop with a detour was added, i.e. Nanadakesri. It is at this point, that the deities and devotees from Kumaon assimilate with the main Jaat.  Now people from the entire Garhwal division-Kumaon division, as well as other parts of India and the world participate in Nanda Devi Raj Jat yatra

Although goddess Nanda Devi is worshipped at dozens of places in Garhwal, as well as Kumaun, but the region around Mt. Nanda Devi and its sanctuary, which falls in the Chamoli Garhwal district, is the prime area related to Nanda Devi. In Chamoli Garhwal, Nanda Devi Raj Jaat is organized once in 12 years. The Jaat (meaning Yatra or pilgrimage) starts from Nauti village near Karnprayag and goes up to the heights of Roopkund and Homkund with a four horned sheep (called Chausingya-Meda in Garhwali). After the Havan-Yagna is done, the sheep is freed with decorated ornaments, food and clothing, and other offerings.

An annual Nanda Jaat is also celebrated called as lok jaat. The Jaat procession goes through villages, where there is a recognized Nanda Devi temple. At Koti, a night halt of the participants takes place where a night-long worship and celebrations take place.

Due to the heavy rain and cloudburst in June 2013 in Uttarakhand, which led to major loss of life and property and caused massive destruction to the region, the Nanda Devi Raj Jat Yatra from 29 scheduled to take place in August 2013 was postponed to the year 2014.

Nanda Devi's worship in Garhwal and the history of the Raj-Jaat
Initially when the Raj-Jaat started in the a small Hamlet of Chamoli Garhwal, it was a much smaller affair compared to the scale of today's events. The main families associated with the Raj-Jaat are the royal family of Kansua (Kansua ka Kunwar) and the Nautiyals of Nauti village, otherwise known as Gurujis as only they had the right to be the Royal priests and advisers. The eleven remaining clans of Barathogi-Baman (Nautiyals being one of them) got associated quickly after that. Barathogi-Baman are the twelve chief (Thokdar) Brahmin families from their twelve native villages. When more help was required to manage the crowd and the activities, neighbouring clans from Rawat and Negi communities were engaged and they too got associated with the Raj-Jaat.

The whole Yatra signifies the journey of the newly wed Nanda Devi (Gora is also used very commonly and interchangeably), leaving her maternal home and going to Kailash. Officially, as per the traditions, the goddess visits her maternal family after every twelve years, and then after weeks of celebrations she goes back to Kailash. So as per the local Garhwali customs, everyone visits her before she leaves, and she is presented with lots of gifts. A number of deities from neighbouring areas pay her a visit, and she visits a number of temples too. The last temple of the last village that the goddess visits is dedicated to her Dharam-Bhai (brother by the virtue of duty), called Laatu-Devta. The whole area which is covered during the yatra is divided in two parts, the initial one being the Mait (Maternal Home or Mother's house) and the later half being Sauraas (In-Laws house or Husband's home). The people of the Mait region tend to get very emotional during this Yatra, as if sending off their own daughter to her Sauraas.

This Raj jat yatra originates from Nauti village 25 km from Karnprayag, in Karnprayag tahsil of the Indian state of Uttarakhand. The Kunwar of village Kansua inaugurates the ceremony, however the main priest of Nanda Devi Raj Jat Yatra remains the Nautiyals originated from Nauti Village, near to Kansua. The legend of this yatra is Nanda Devi, who is consort of Lord Shiva left her village and went to the Nanda Devi parbat. Therefore, when the yatra starts, heavy rain occurs as if the devi is crying. This yatra covers many villages and in the way, the Devi meets her sister in the Bhagwati village.

This journey is a difficult one because of the difficult terrain it goes through. During the journey, one passes by a Lake known as Roopkund surrounded by hundreds of ancient skeletons. According to local mythology, once a King took some dancers to this sacred spot. Due to heavy snowfall, the people were trapped and the dancers were transformed into skeletons and stones that can be seen in Patarnachonia. Another myth is this that king Yasodhwal's wife was pregnant and while she was giving birth to her child, her placenta flowed down to Roopkund and this in turn caused the death of the people there.

Nanda Devi's Worship in Kumaun

In Kumaun, Nanda Devi and Sunanda Devi are worshipped together as twin goddesses. The twin peaks of the Nanda Devi and Sunanda Devi Mountain are said to be the abode of the two goddesses. These graceful peaks are visible from most of the Kumaon Division.

During the period of Chand kings, Nanda Devi worship took the shape of a fair. Prior to that, Nanda Devi was being worshipped, but at that time only an idol of Nanda Devi used to be worshipped. The custom to make two idols started from the period of Baj Bahadur Chand. Even today, only one idol is prepared in the remote villages. The reason for this addition appears to be because the goddesses Nanda and Sunanda together took birth as princesses in the royal family and to mark this new reincarnation, the practice of celebrating a festival for both sisters together was introduced in which a story from their life is enacted.
Though in the Johar Valley region, there is no tradition of Nanda Raj Jaat but the worship, dance and the ritual of collecting Bramhakamal (it is called Kaul Kamphu) is part of Nanda festivals. The Nanda Devi fair is held at Almora, Nainital, Kot (Dangoli), Ranikhet, Bhowali, Kichha and also in the far flung villages of Lohar (like Milam and Martoli) and Pindar valleys (like Wachham and Khati). In the villages of the Pinder valley, people celebrate the Nanda Devi Jaat (journey) every year, while in Lohar people come from far and wide to Danadhar, Suring, Milam and Martoli in order to worship the Goddess. In Nainital and Almora, thousands take part in the procession carrying the dola (or palanquin) of Nanda Devi. It is said that the Nanda Devi fairs started in Kumaon during the reign of the King Kalyan Chand in the 16th century. A three-day fair is held at Kot Ki Mai or Kot Bhramari Devi. The fair at Saneti comes every second year. Both these fairs are rich in folk expressions, and many village products are brought for sale.

Nanda Devi Raj Jat Yatra 2014

The Nanda Devi Raj Jat Yatra 2014 started from 18 August 2014 and went up to 6 September 2014. The Yatra's total distance covered approximately 290 km. The 230 km distance was covered by foot or by trekking route and the rest 60 km was covered by the bus transport. Before the present Yatra of Nanda Raj Jat Yatra, the trip was held in the year 2000, and it is one of the biggest trips of Uttarakhand. The Main things of Nanda Devi Raj Jat Yatra is the distance covered on foot. So it is considered a very holy Trip.  Many Tourists from various parts of India and from abroad have come to join the holy Nanda Devi Raj Jat Yatra.

Transportation 
 By air: To attend Nanda Devi Raj Jat Yatra, one has to first reach Chamoli. The closest airport is Jolly Grant Airport, 221 kilometers away.
 By rail: The closest railway station is located at Rishikesh.
 By road: Chamoli is connected with Haridwar, Dehradun, Nainital, Rishikesh, and Almora.
 Lodging: There are many small towns and villages (namely: Kulsari, Tharali, Deval, Mundoli, Lohajung pass) those offer stay during Raj Jat Yatra. Tharali is the biggest town among these. It is a tehsil headquarters. During Raj Jat Yatra, district administration of Chamoli also provides tents to tourists after a certain location (usually on higher altitude location after village Wan).

Books 
 Aitken, Bill. (reprinted 1994). The Nanda Devi Affair, Penguin Books India. 
Alter, Stephen – Becoming A Mountain.

References

External links 
 Nanda Devi Temple at Almora
Nanda Devi Raj Jat Yatra 2014 Date & Schedule
Nanda Devi Raj Jat Video 2014, sample video

Festivals in Uttarakhand
Culture of Uttarakhand